Better Youth Organization Records (BYO) is a Los Angeles, California based independent punk rock record label created by Shawn and Mark Stern, two of the three brothers of the California punk rock band Youth Brigade (the third being Adam Stern who plays bass but does not run BYO).

Aim and history
BYO aims to promote punk and other alternative youth cultures in a positive light. BYO released records by 7 Seconds, Agression, and SNFU in the 1980s, as well as Leatherface, Kosher, The Unseen, Throw Rag, Jon Cougar Concentration Camp, Automatic 7 and The Briefs. It also started the BYO Split Series of full-length records shared by bands from other labels, such as Leatherface/Hot Water Music, Swingin' Utters/Youth Brigade, NOFX/Rancid, The Bouncing Souls/Anti-Flag and Alkaline Trio/One Man Army.

Before BYO became a record label they started as a fanzine, in 1981, named after their namesake. The zine intended to tackle the issues of police brutality and the negative views towards punks and the punk scene. As of late-2013, the label is defunct.

See also
BYO Records discography
List of record labels

References

 
American independent record labels
Punk record labels
Record labels established in 1982
1982 establishments in California